Prof. Ravindra Kumar Sinha (born 15 February 1960) is the Vice Chancellor of Gautam Buddha University, Greater Noida, Gautam Budh Nagar Under UP Government. He was the director of the CSIR-Central Scientific Instruments Organisation (CSIR-CSIO) Sector-30C, Chandigarh-160 030, India.  He has been  a Professor - Applied Physics, Dean-Academic [UG] & Chief Coordinator: TIFAC-Center of Relevance and Excellence in Fiber Optics and Optical Communication, Mission REACH Program, Technology Vision-2020, Govt. of India Delhi Technological University (formerly Delhi College of Engineering, University of Delhi) Bawana Road, Delhi-110042, India.

Early life 
Prof. Sinha graduated with masters in physics (M.Sc Physics) from Indian Institute of Technology (IIT) Kharagpur in 1984 and moved to Indian Institute of Technology (IIT) Delhi from where he secured a PhD in 1989-90. Topic of his PhD thesis is A Study of the Propagation Characteristics of Rectangular Core Optical Waveguides and Devices under the guidance of Prof Arun Kumar and Prof B.P. Pal in Optical wave guide group headed by Prof. Ajoy Ghatak during the period of 1984-1989.

Professional career 
He worked at Osaka University for foreign studies, Osaka and Kobe University in Japan as Japanese government scholar during the period October 1989 - March 1991. Further during April 1991 - December 1992 he has worked as Research Associate in Electrical Communication Engineering Department of Indian Institute of Science (IISc), Bangalore.

He joined as lecturer at Birla Institute of Technology and Science (BITS) Pilani during January 1992 - September 1994.Thereafter he was assistant professor at Regional Engineering College, now known as National Institute of Technology (NIT) at Hamirpur (H.P.), India during October 17, 1994 - December 30, 1998. Then he joined as assistant professor at Delhi College of Engineering-DCE (Faculty of Technology, University of Delhi) during December 31, 1998 to October 17, 2002.

He was Dean (Industrial Research & Development) at DCE/DTU during August 7, 2008 to August 31, 2010 and Head of Department of Applied Physics Department and Dean (academic-UG) during January 2015 to June 2015 at Delhi Technological University.

He was a Chief Coordinator: TIFAC-Center of Relevance & Excellence (CORE) in Fiber Optics & Optical Communication at Delhi College of Engineering” under the program “Mission Reach”, Technology Vision 2020, Technology Information Forecasting and Assessment Council, Department of Science & Technology, Govt. of India since its inception in year 2005.

He has served as a  Director, CSIR-Central Scientific Instruments Organisation (CSIO) Chandigarh since July 2, 2015 to February 2020. He has also served as Director, CSIR-Central Electronics Engineering Research Institute (CEERI), Pilani during November 6, 2015 to March 8, 2016 and Director CSIR-Institute of Microbial Technology (IMTECH), Chandigarh since April 11, 2016 to January 22, 2017 as additional charge. His major research area is Fiber Optics and Photonics and he is currently working on Nano-photonic Devices for Telecom and Sensing Applications.His recent book on Zero Index Metamterials is published in April 2021 (https://www.google.co.in/books/edition/Zero_Index_Metamaterials/h_QkEAAAQBAJ?hl=en&gbpv=1&printsec=frontcover
). He has also published a review paper on Supercontinuum Generation using soft glass specialty  optical fiber.
He is recipient of Research Excellence Award of DTU in 2021 & 2022, Gold Skoch Award for development of defense technology in 2020, CSIR Technology Award 2018,
Fulbright-Nehru Fellowship, Royal Academic Engineering Fellowship, Indo-Swiss Bilateral Research Fellowship, Japan Society for promotion of Science Fellowship, Japanese Govt. Scholarship, National Council of Taiwan Fellowship besides several visiting scientist assignment in several country. He is a fellow of International Society of Optics and Photonics (SPIE), Optical Society of India and IETE(India).

Other positions 
Dr. Sinha is a member of many boards and other organizations. Some of them are:
 Chairman, Institution of Electronics and Telecommunication Engineers-IETE (India)- Chandigarh Region, Chandigarh
 Member, Board of Governance of PEC University, Chandigarh
 Member, Research Council, LASTECH, DRDO, Delhi
 Member, Management Council, CSIR-National Physical Laboratory (NPL), Delhi
 Member, Executive Board, High Power Fiber Laser Research Program of LASTECH/DRDO
 Member, Higher Educational Council, Union Territory Chandigarh
 Member, Board of Governance, Punjab State Council for Science and Technology
 Member, Board of Governance, Pushpa Gujral Science City, Jallundher
 Member, State Higher Education Council, Chandigarh
 Member, Management Council, CSIR-Central Electro-Chemical Research Institute, Karaikudi, Tamil Nadu
 Member, Management Council of CSIR-Central Glass and Ceramic Research Institute, Kolkata
 Chief Coordinator, TePP (Technopreneur Promotion Program) Outreach cum Cluster Innovation Center at CSIO Chandigarh, DSIR, Govt. of India
 Principal Investigator/Co PI:- Bilateral Research Projects (i) Indo-Russia under DSTRMES program during 2014-2016 on Optical Nano Antenna (ii) Indo-Tunisia during 2013-2016 on Non-Linear Fiber Optics and (iii) Indo-Portugal on Carbon NanoTube during 2014-2016, through International Division, DST, Govt. of India.(iv) Indo-Russia under DST-RFBR program on Novel approaches to control EM waves during 2015-2017 (Awarded while working at DTU and are active as well)
 Principal Investigator/Co PI “Modeling and Simulation of High Power Fiber Lasers” Sponsored Project under Contract for Acquisition of Research Services from LASTEC Lab, DRDO, Govt. of India during 2015-2016. (Awarded while working at DTU)
 Chairman, Organization of Training Program on Management of Scientific Research for Value Creation, CSIR, Delhi, India
 Member, Skill Development Initiative, CSIR, Govt. of India
 Member, Publication Committee of IETE Journal of Research and IETE Technical Review Journal, IETE (India) Delhi since 2016
 Member, Skill Development Program and Indian Industry Conclave committee of IETE (India)
 Member, Technology Systems Development Board, Department of Science and Technology, Govt. of India with effect from December 2016 for a period of three years.
 Expert Member, Faculty of Science, University of Kurukshetra University, Kurukshetra
 Member, Management Council, CSIR-Institute of Microbial Technology, Chandigarh
 Member, Governing Council, Center for Consultancy in Engineering, PEC University of Technology, Chandigarh
 Member: CII National Committee on Higher Education
 Expert Member: National System Safety Regulatory Authority (Brainstorming Session)

Major Research Work 

Successfully developed theory and experiments for characterization of telecom grade single mode optical fibers as well as elliptical core fibers for coherent optical communication from measurements of far field radiation patterns. This technique was extended for developing new methods for characterization of single mode integrated planar and rectangular core channel optical waveguides from far field measurements. This was followed by the development of coupled mode theory for design of 4x4 optical fiber and waveguide couplers and their applications in the design of optical homodyne receivers.

Development of analytical methods for dispersion compensation of light wave signals using differential time delay technique incorporating the effect of higher orders terms in propagation constant of modes in optical fiber for their application in higher rate of data transmission. Development of a scheme for bit delay correction for WDM based Optical Communication System. Multiple Access techniques in Optical Fiber Communication systems leading to development of 3-D  Optical Code sequences. Optical CDMA and Optical Turbo Codes and their performance evaluation in terms of SNR, BER and ISI in optical communication systems are published by me as author/co-author of leading journals of repute.

Development of coupled mode theory for Electron Waveguide and their application in the design of high speed Quantum Size Devices based on electron wave propagation in multiple quantum well semiconductors at Nano-scale was proposed and nano-electronic devices (Electron Waveguide Couplers, Switches and Filters) were designed with enhanced transmission characteristics.

In addition to the above, most of his recent significant research contributions are:

Photonic Crystal based nanophotonic devices: Photonic crystals are periodic dielectric structures that have a band gap that forbids propagation of a certain frequency range of light. This property enables one to control light with amazing facility and produce effects that are impossible with conventional optics. Various new design of photonic crystal made of silicon on insulator (SOI) is proposed for design and development of photonic crystal based coupler, Y splitter, Dual band wavelength multiplexor and de-multiplexors. A new design of Super polarizer is also proposed and its degree of polarization and fabrication tolerance were also estimated. This was followed by the design of photonic crystal structure for slow light generation leading to formation of soliton at incredibly low power, design of Dense Wavelength Division Multiplexor (DWDM) and de-multiplexore for telecom application.

Metamaterials and Negative refraction:  A new structure of exhibiting negative refraction (called metamaterial) is designed, analyzed, fabricated and experimentally characterized. This was experimentally realized using V-shaped split ring resonator made up of two dimensional arrays of 50 nanometer thick gold on n-doped silicon substrate. It is shown that by changing the angular gap of V- shaped SRRs, it is possible to tune the electromagnetic parameters (such as dielectric permitivity, permeability and refractive index) and control the flow of light for design and development of metamaterial based optical switches and sensors at nano-scale.

In addition, left handed (metamaterials exhibiting negative refraction) metallo-dielectric photonic crystal exhibiting All Angle Negative Refraction for visible light is analyzed with detailed theoretical and numerical demonstration for the first time. On the same line another new design of left handed metamaterial structure is analyzed and proposed for generation of ultra violet light via second harmonic generation. Here, it is shown that negative index is achieved by excitation of Surface Plasmon Polariton waves operating in dispersion regime with anti parallel refracted wave vector and the Poynting vector.

Plasmonics & Plasmonic Bandgap Engineering: Surface Plasmon Polaritons (SPPs) are electromagnetic waves guided along metal dielectric interfaces resulting from the interaction of incident photon with that of collective electron oscillation in metals. SPPs have shorter wavelength than that of incident photons and hence provide strong spatial confinement with promising application in the design and development of sub nano-scale devices. A new concept of Plasmonic Band Gap engineering is highlighted and used for SPP propagation leading to formation of Plasmonic Waveguides. Several types of plasmonic waveguides exhibiting superior propagation characteristics were designed leading to proposal of a new design of Plasmonic Mach-Zhender Interferrometer (PMZI) sensor. It is shown that proposed PMZI has very high sensitivity of the order of 6000 nm/RIU, which has been effectively used for label free classification and detection of cancer cell.

Field Emission characteristics of Carbon Nanotube (CNT) & Nano-Bio Sensors: CNTs were grown using Inconel and silicon substrates and their field emission characteristics have been studied with a view of their promising applications for next generation high performance flat panel devices. Later field emission with ultralow turn on voltage (of the order 0.1 volt/µm) from metal decorated CNTs have been obtained. A single-step method for synthesis and deposition of gold nanostructures was developed for fabrication of a highly sensitive and selective cholesterol nano-biosensor. Using electrochemical synthesis and assembly of gold nanostructures high performance electrochemical biosensor is fabricated which can be utilized for healthcare diagnostic applications.

Photonic Crystal Fiber (PCF) & Supercontinuum generation: Prof. Sinha developed several analytical and numerical techniques for studying light wave propagation characteristics through specially designed photonic crystal fibers and developed experimental techniques for their characterization which have become topic of various text and reference books these days and very well cited by research community. Application specific photonic crystal fibers like large mode area PCF and Triangular core PCF were also designed. Very recently, a new design of PCF called Triangular Core Graded Index PCF were designed and analyzed for ultra broad band ( i.e. 2-15 µm, so far highest range) supercontinuum  spectrum in  mid infrared region.

References 

1960 births
Indian optical physicists
Living people